Blood Curse (Portuguese: Coisa Ruim) is a 2006 Portuguese supernatural horror film directed by Tiago Guedes and Frederico Serra, which talks about demonic possession, exploring beliefs, superstitions, skepticism, fears and suspicions, in the context of a small village. It has been considered the first horror feature film from Portugal.

Plot 

Xavier Oliveira Monteiro (Adriano Luz) is a botanical researcher and university professor in the same area. He lives with his wife, children and a baby grandson in an apartment in the center of Lisbon. One day, Xavier receives news of the death of his uncle, owner of a family manor in a village in the municipality of Seia. Because he is the only legitimate heir, he becomes the owner of that same property. When he wanted to publish a study on the flora of Beira Interior, he decided to move with his family to the same house. Upon arriving at the village, he becomes friends with the locals, who he perceives to be very superstitious and believers in matters related to the occult. At first Xavier tries to abstract himself from that kind of thoughts, but strange events with no logical explanation begin to occur to him, as well as to his family; hitting right with some local beliefs. For that very reason, Xavier then decides to go after the rural beliefs of his new land to find some explanation for what is happening to him. It is there that Vicente, a former village priest (José Pinto) reveals to him something dark and macabre that happened in the past, and which gave rise to a terrible curse that plagues the village and which is directly related to Xavier and his family.

Cast

Reception 
It won the 2006 Portuguese Golden Globe for Best Film.

References

External links 
 

2006 horror films
2006 films
Films directed by Tiago Guedes
Films directed by Frederico Serra
Films set in Portugal
Portuguese horror films
2000s supernatural horror films
Golden Globes (Portugal) winners
2000s Portuguese-language films